Caressa Venal Cameron-Jackson (born August 4, 1987) is an American beauty pageant titleholder and occasional singer who was Miss Virginia 2009 and Miss America 2010. She is the eighth African American Miss America titleholder, the first Black Miss Virginia to be crowned Miss America.

Early life and education
The Virginia native is a graduate of Massaponax High School and Virginia Commonwealth University. In 2002, Cameron graduated from Barbizon Modeling and Acting School in Virginia.

Pageantry

Miss Virginia Teen USA 2005
Cameron placed second runner-up to Tori Hall at the Miss Virginia Teen USA 2005 pageant.

Miss Virginia USA 2006
She was second runner-up to Amber Copley at the Miss Virginia USA 2006 pageant.

Miss Virginia 2006-2008
She was placed second runner-up in the 2006 and 2007 Miss Virginia pageants. At the 2008 competition, Cameron was named first runner-up. Due to this placement, Cameron qualified to compete in the National Sweetheart 2008 pageant, where Miss Virginia later was named the fourth runner-up.

Miss Virginia 2009
Cameron was crowned Miss Virginia on June 28, 2009, winning on her fourth attempt.

Miss America 2010
On January 27, 2010, the performer won a $2,000 scholarship in succeeding the preliminary talent competition in vocal pop.

On January 30, 2010, Cameron won the Miss America 2010 pageant held at Planet Hollywood in Las Vegas, Nevada.

Miss America role
She traveled more than 250,000 miles during her year of service advocating for her personal platform, "Real Talk: AIDS in America" and spoke to over 80,000 students around the nation about healthy choices. For her efforts, Caressa was the recipient of the President’s Volunteer Service Award and a Congressional Honor. The titleholder performed during the Presidential Inauguration festivities in 2009, the 2010 White House Christmas Tree lighting, and more.

Personal life
Cameron married her high school sweetheart, Nathaniel Jackson Jr., on December 2, 2012. Cameron wore a Sareh Nouri wedding gown. The couple welcomed their first child, Tres, on June 27, 2016. They welcomed their second child and first daughter, Cammie, on January 27, 2020. The family reside in Locust Grove, Virginia.

References

Video clips
"Miss America 2010 Caressa Cameron sings God Bless America" video, Miss America 2010 Caressa Cameron sings "God Bless America" at the Independence Day Parade in Philadelphia on July 4, 2010.

External links

Official website

Living people
Miss America 2010 delegates
Miss America winners
People from Fredericksburg, Virginia
American beauty pageant winners
Miss America Preliminary Talent winners
Virginia Commonwealth University alumni
Miss Virginia winners
1987 births
African-American beauty pageant winners
21st-century African-American women
21st-century African-American people